William Irving (November 11, 1927 – November 25, 1987) was a Canadian archaeologist and scholar of the prehistory of the North American Arctic. He was internationally recognized as a leading scholar of the historical Inuit cultures of north Alaska. Irving was born in Toronto, Canada. He received a Ph.D. in anthropology from the University of Wisconsin at Madison in 1964. His scholarly work includes a study of the early peopling of the Americas. He discovered and named the Arctic Small Tool tradition.

References 

1927 births
1987 deaths
Canadian archaeologists
Scientists from Toronto
University of Wisconsin–Madison alumni